The Islamic Coalition was an electoral list which contested the Iraqi legislative election of December 2005.

It was formed by two parties which were members of the main religious Shi'ite-majority list, the United Iraqi Alliance, for the Iraqi legislative election of January 2005 - the Islamic Action Organisation and the Islamic Fayli Grouping in Iraq.

Four other groups - the Religious Commonwealth In Iraq, the Islamic Commonwealth For Iraqi Students, the Hussaini Cultural Organizations Union and the Rafah And Freedom Movement were also listed as being part of this list.

The list failed to win any seats in the December elections.
Defunct political party alliances in Iraq